This is a list of projected numbers of casualties should a nuclear weapon be detonated in a certain city or other population center.

Method
The effects of any nuclear explosion is dependent on a very large number of factors, including but not limited to type of nuclear device, delivery method, explosion type (whether air burst or surface burst), the target's structural anatomy, and atmospheric conditions. To estimate the number of casualties in addition to this poses an even greater challenge.

A nuclear explosion may not hit a city directly. If distinguished, this list uses the estimate with the shortest distance.

Any nuclear attack will have consequences far beyond the area directly affected by the explosion, and the people killed in the nuclear fireball and its immediate radiation. Aside from the political, military and tactical considerations of nuclear attacks on civilians, additional effects include the subsequent nuclear fallout which spreads radioactive particles across large distances, the potential of nuclear winter and other nuclear-related climate change, and the long-term effects of radioactive exposure on human health, such as radiation-induced cancer. If distinguished, this list takes into account immediate deaths and short-term deaths, and not long-term health complications.

This list only includes casualties made from hypothetical nuclear scenarios and does not include death tolls from actual nuclear attacks. Nuclear weapons have only been used in combat twice throughout history and in a form of a strategic weapon, during the bombings of Hiroshima and Nagasaki in World War II, which killed approximately 105,000 people.

Estimates of deaths after nuclear attacks were of especially high interest during the Cold War.

Estimated death tolls from nuclear attacks on cities

Notes

See also
World War III
Mutual assured destruction
Nuclear holocaust
Nuclear terrorism
List of states with nuclear weapons
List of nuclear and radiation accidents by death toll
Civilian casualties of strategic bombing
On Thermonuclear War
Dr. Strangelove
Nukemap, an online tool for simulating nuclear explosions

References

Lists by death toll
Nuclear warfare
War-related deaths
Nuclear terrorism